The 2006 Hopman Cup (also known as the Hyundai Hopman Cup for sponsorship reasons) was the 18th Hopman Cup tournament. The champions were Lisa Raymond and Taylor Dent of the United States. The Netherlands qualified and reached the final. Michaëlla Krajicek won her singles match, and Taylor Dent beat Peter Wessels. The mixed doubles competition was won in close sets by Raymond and Dent. The event was held at the Burswood Entertainment Complex in Perth on 30 December 2005 through 6 January 2006. This was the first elite-level tennis tournament in which players could challenge line calls using the Hawk-Eye technology. Players or teams had a limit of two unsuccessful challenges per set.

Teams

Seeds
 – Lisa Raymond and Taylor Dent (champions)
 – Gisela Dulko and Gastón Gaudio
 – Samantha Stosur and either Wayne Arthurs or Todd Reid
 – Svetlana Kuznetsova and Yuri Schukin

Unseeded
 – Peng Shuai and Sun Peng
 – Anna-Lena Grönefeld and Nicolas Kiefer
 – Michaëlla Krajicek and Peter Wessels (finalists)
 – Ana Ivanovic and Novak Djokovic
 – Sofia Arvidsson and Thomas Johansson

Play-off

Netherlands vs. China

Group A

Standings

United States vs. Serbia and Montenegro

Serbia and Montenegro vs. Sweden

United States vs. Russia

Russia vs. Sweden

Serbia and Montenegro vs. Russia

Sweden vs. United States

Group B

Standings

Germany vs. Australia

Netherlands vs. Argentina

Netherlands vs. Australia

Argentina vs. Germany

Australia vs. Argentina

Netherlands vs. Germany

Final

United States vs. Netherlands

External links

ITF 2006 Hopman Cup Preview
2006 Hopman Cup Article from the ITF
Match Article from ABC
ITF review

2006
Hopman Cup
Hopman Cup